Sternbergia lutea, the winter daffodil, autumn daffodil, fall daffodil, lily-of-the-field, or yellow autumn crocus, is a bulbous flowering plant in the family Amaryllidaceae, subfamily Amaryllidoideae, in the Narcisseae tribe, which is used as an ornamental plant. It has yellow flowers which appear in autumn.

The Latin specific epithet lutea means "yellow".

Description

Sternbergia lutea has a wide distribution from the Balearic Islands in the Western Mediterranean through to Tajikistan in Central Asia. It dies down to a bulb during the summer. Leaves first appear in the autumn (September to November in its native habitats), and are glossy green, up to 12 mm wide; they remain through the winter.

Deep yellow flowers appear soon after the leaves, with six tepals around 3–3.5 cm long, six yellow stamens and a style with a single stigma.

Smaller forms with narrower leaves (up to 5 mm wide) and narrower tepals (3–12 mm rather than 10–20 mm) have been separated off under various names (e.g. S. lutea var. graeca, S. sicula). All are treated as S. lutea in the Kew World Checklist.

Cultivation 
Sternbergia lutea is hardy to USDA hardiness zones 7–9 (−18 to −1 °C) depending on the degree of protection given. It can be grown outside in the British Isles in well-drained soil; a warm dry period in summer is required for good flowering. Alkaline soils are recommended. Bulbs are usually planted while dormant (i.e. in late summer or early autumn), but can be lifted and divided before the leaves die down in late spring.

This plant has gained the Royal Horticultural Society’s Award of Garden Merit.

A vigorous form with narrow leaves is grown in gardens under the name S. lutea var. angustifolia.

Notes

References

External link

Amaryllidoideae
Plants described in 1753
Taxa named by Carl Linnaeus
Flora of the Balearic Islands
Flora of Sardinia
Flora of Spain
Flora of Southeastern Europe
Flora of Central Asia
Flora of Turkmenistan
Flora of Tajikistan
Flora of the Transcaucasus
Flora of Western Asia